Kumanovo is a village in Aksakovo Municipality, in Varna Province, Bulgaria.

Kumanovo Peak on Oscar II Coast in Graham Land, Antarctica is named after the village.

References

Villages in Varna Province